Brett Allan Dutton (born 18 November 1966) is an Australian former professional cyclist, who currently works as a directeur sportif for UCI Continental team . He won the bronze medal in Men's team pursuit in the 1988 Summer Olympics.

Dutton set the fastest time in the Goulburn to Sydney Classic in 1992 run from Goulburn to Liverpool.

References

External links

1966 births
Living people
Cyclists at the 1988 Summer Olympics
Olympic cyclists of Australia
Olympic bronze medalists for Australia
Australian male cyclists
Olympic medalists in cycling
Place of birth missing (living people)
Medalists at the 1988 Summer Olympics
Commonwealth Games medallists in cycling
Commonwealth Games gold medallists for Australia
Australian track cyclists
Cyclists at the 1986 Commonwealth Games
20th-century Australian people
21st-century Australian people
Medallists at the 1986 Commonwealth Games